A Shakira impersonator is an artist who mimics or copies the look and sound of Colombian singer-songwriter Shakira. Professional Shakira impersonators or tribute acts have been around since at least the mid-2000s, and continue to be highly popular due to Shakira's enduring appeal. Some tribute acts have performed in front of thousands of people in both Latin and other countries. Many Shakira tribute acts include in their repertoire a re-enactment of her presentations at awards ceremonies such as the Latin Grammys or her famous appearance at the Super Bowl. Some impersonators have performed on television programs, or in nightclubs and music festivals.

Origins 

Shakira impersonators began to appear in the mid-1990s when Latin youth imitated the style portrayed on the cover of her second studio album. Braids and "rock" style were a sensation in countries like Peru, Colombia, Mexico, Argentina. Many youth imitated her characteristic dance and style. One commentator said that "not only has her music been a huge sensation in the United States, but her look of skin-tight thrift-shop hip-huggers, old belly shirts and funky hats have set off a style revolution that has spread to girls around the world.  But any effect she’s had on the fashion world has slipped right past Shakira." After Shakira's crossover to the mainstream and subsequent makeover, girls and young people changed their style to more closely resemble their idol's by wearing Belly Dance belts and changing their hair colour to blond. In Colombian talent contests young women moved and sang as similar to Shakira as possible.  Shakira's dance style was mimicked  worldwide by young people and adults who saw her as a role model.

Cultural depictions 
In general, imitating Shakira is a fairly common practice in mostly Latino and Hispanic countries. This artistic practice came in a variety of types and forms, including impersonations, cosplays, or sound imitations and also as skits and drag

performance. Her fandom was done in an amateur way (fan conventions, theme parties, tours and other forms of adulation), professional Shakira impersonators are labeled as tribute bands to her and also Impressionists. The general public have done so through competitions, as well as public personalities in other modalities such as tribute shows.

In the American continent, various Shakira Impersonators have been presented in programs such as Mi Nombre Es..., Buscando una Estrella, or the Chilean and Peruvian television series Yo Soy.  In Tu cara me suena de España, she has been imitated on multiple occasions, including the interpreters of Leslie Shaw, Eva Soriano and more.

On some occasions Shakira has been parodies with artists being imitators, as is the case of actress Mo Collins from the American program Mad TV who made a video in 2001 parodying the singles "Whenever Wherever" and "Objection (Tango)". Similarly, the Australian show Big Bite made a video parodying the song "Whenever Wherever" in 2001.

The singer María Gracia Viteri became an impersonator of Shakira in her concert offered in the city of Sambordón, paying tribute with a medley of her greatest hits in both Spanish and English.

Awards 
In 2022, the Chamber of Broadcasters of Mexico in the United States awarded Shakibecca the "Golden Microphone" award for "Outstanding career as Shakira's double"

Examples of professional Shakira impersonators/Tribute Bands 
The following is a selected style list of Shakira impersonators and tribute bands who have gained recognition in the entertainment industry.

 Shakibecca: She began in 1996 at the age of 12 imitating dance, later she participated in musical programs on Venezuelan television. She participated in Fama, sudor y lagrimas and in Buscando una Estrella, in the latter personifying Shakira where, at just 15 years old, she met the artist for the first time. Such was the success achieved that they called her from Mexico to continue her imitations in Parodiando.
 Ciego Sordomudos Band: A Peruvian band formed 3 years ago that tours Peru performing tribute concerts to Shakira, mostly playing songs from the albums "Pies Descalzos" and " Donde Estan los Ladrones?".
 Noelia Quiroz: Known as the "Chilean Shakira" she made her debut thanks to her participation in programs such as "My name is...", performs tribute acts throughout her country and is the most famous Shakira imitator in her country.

Influenced but not impersonating 

Indian singer and actress Neha Kakkar in her youth was often referred to as the "Shakira of India" due to their similar styles.

See also 

 Cultural Impact of Shakira
 Shakira

References 

Shakira
Tribute acts